Anglian College London (ACL) is a British college of further and higher education operating mainly from Woolwich, London. It has four academic and one administrative departments providing services to both UK and non-UK students.

It is one of the few colleges accredited by both City and Guilds and Association of Business Executives (ABE) in the region. It has been recommended by the NEBDN for the dental nursing programme in its own private surgery.

Two of its students secured Gold Medals from the IMIS in 2007 examinations. It offers over fifty programmes, including Health and Social Care and Overseas Nursing Programmes.

References

External links 
Anglian College London

Education in the Royal Borough of Greenwich
Educational institutions established in 2004
2004 establishments in England